People's Party of Guinea is a political party, based amongst the Kissi minority in the interior region. The party is led by Pascual Tolno, a former minister. Ahead of the 1998 election, the party was part of the RPG-led alliance Coordination of the Democratic Opposition (CODEM).

References

Political parties in Guinea